Louis Carnot (born 25 February 2001) is a French professional footballer who plays as a midfielder for French club Lille reserve team.

Club career
On 8 March 2019, Carnot signed his first professional contract with his youth club Guingamp for a three-year term. He made his professional debut with Guingamp in a 2–2 Ligue 1 tie with Nîmes on 18 May 2019.

On 1 February 2021, Carnot joined Concarneau on loan for the remainder of the 2020–21 season, in order to get more playing time.

Personal life
Carnot is the son of the former footballer Stéphane Carnot.

References

External links

2001 births
Living people
Sportspeople from Côtes-d'Armor
French footballers
France youth international footballers
Association football midfielders
En Avant Guingamp players
US Concarneau players
Ligue 1 players
Ligue 2 players
Championnat National players
Championnat National 3 players
Footballers from Brittany